Ralph Trustees Limited is a family run private hotel group based in England with a portfolio of four hotels operating in the four and five star sector. Their hotels include The Grove (Hertfordshire), The Athenaeum (London), The Runnymede (Surrey) and 23 Greengarden House (London).

References

External links
 Athenaeum Hotel and Apartments — The Athenaeum Hotel official website
 Greengarden House Apartments — Greengarden House official website
 Runnymede Hotel & Spa — The Runnymede Hotel official website
 The Grove Hotel & Spa — The Grove Hotel official website

Hotel and leisure companies of the United Kingdom